A list of 'effects' that have been noticed in the field of psychology.

See also 

 List of cognitive biases
 List of fallacies
 False memory
 Uncanny valley

Effects